My Kind of Broadway is a 1965 studio album by Frank Sinatra. It is a collection of songs from various musicals, pieced together from various recording sessions over the previous four years. The album features songs from nine arrangers and composers, the most ever on a single Sinatra album. While the title of the album is "My Kind of Broadway", both the Gershwin songs on the album "They Can't Take That Away From Me" and "Nice Work If You Can Get It" were written by George and Ira Gershwin for films ("Shall We Dance" and "Damsel in Distress" respectively) and not for Broadway musicals.

Track listing
"Everybody Has the Right to Be Wrong (At Least Once)" (Sammy Cahn, Jimmy Van Heusen)ab – 2:05
"Golden Moment" (Kenny Jacobson, Rhoda Roberts)ad – 3:01
"Luck Be a Lady" (Frank Loesser)eg – 5:15
"Lost in the Stars" (Maxwell Anderson, Kurt Weill)cd – 4:08
"Hello, Dolly!" (Jerry Herman)hij – 2:45
"I'll Only Miss Her When I Think of Her" (Cahn, Van Heusen)abq – 2:50
"They Can't Take That Away from Me" (George Gershwin, Ira Gershwin)kl – 2:40
"Yesterdays" (Otto Harbach, Jerome Kern)mn – 3:45
"Nice Work If You Can Get It" (G. Gershwin, I. Gershwin)kl – 2:33
"Have You Met Miss Jones?" (Richard Rodgers, Lorenz Hart)fg – 2:30
"Without a Song" (Vincent Youmans, Billy Rose, Edward Eliscu)op – 3:37

Personnel
Frank Sinatra - vocals
a Torrie Zito (conductor) and b (arranger)
c Nelson Riddle (conductor) and d (arranger)
e Morris Stoloff (conductor)
f Billy May (conductor) and g (arranger)
h Quincy Jones (conductor) and i (arranger)
j Count Basie and his orchestra (accompanists)
k Neal Hefti (conductor) and l (arranger)
m Don Costa (conductor) and n (arranger)
o Sy Oliver (conductor) and p (arranger)
q Laurindo Almeida (guitar)

References

Frank Sinatra albums
Reprise Records albums
1965 albums
Albums produced by Sonny Burke
Albums conducted by Don Costa
Albums arranged by Don Costa
Albums conducted by Morris Stoloff